Brandon Dillon (born April 30, 1997) is an American football tight end for the Vegas Vipers of the XFL. He played college football for Marian University.

Early life and high school
Dillon grew up in Bringhurst, Indiana and attended Carroll High School in nearby Flora, Indiana, where he played baseball, basketball, and football. In football, Dillon was a four-year starter on both offense and defense and was named All-Area by the Kokomo Tribune twice and was a two-time Class A All-State selection, as well as all-area by the Lafayette Journal & Courier. He was also a two-time All-Area selection in basketball. Despite being recruited by Bowling Green, Toledo and Ohio University to join their programs as a preferred walk-on, Dillon opted to enroll at nearby Marian University, an NAIA school.

College career
Dillon was a member Marian Knights for four seasons and was a freshman when the team won the 2015 NAIA National Championship. As a senior, Dillon caught 35 passes for 603 yards and five touchdowns and was named a first-team NAIA All-American. After the season he was the only NAIA player to be invited to participate in the 2017 NFLPA Collegiate Bowl. Dillon finished his collegiate career with 105 receptions for 1,661 receiving yards and 14 touchdowns in 42 games played.

Professional career

Minnesota Vikings
Dillon signed with the Minnesota Vikings as an undrafted free agent on April 27, 2019. Considered a long shot to make the team, Dillon made the Vikings' 53-man roster out of training camp. He made his NFL debut in the Vikings season opener on September 8, 2019. He was waived on September 10, 2019, and re-signed to the Vikings practice squad the next day. He signed a reserve/future contract with the Vikings on January 12, 2020.

Dillon was waived by the Vikings during final roster cuts on September 5, 2020, and was signed to the practice squad the next day. He was elevated to the active roster on November 15, November 28, and December 5 for the team's weeks 10, 12, and 13 games against the Chicago Bears, Carolina Panthers, and Jacksonville Jaguars, and reverted to the practice squad after each game. He was placed on the practice squad/injured list on December 8. He was placed on the practice squad/COVID-19 list by the team on December 29, and signed a reserve/future contract with the Vikings on January 5, 2021. He was released by the Vikings on September 18, 2021, and re-signed to their practice squad. Dillon was waived on December 28.

New York Jets
On December 29, 2021, Dillon was signed to the New York Jets practice squad. He signed a reserve/future contract with the Jets on January 10, 2022. He was waived on May 9, 2022.

New Orleans Saints
On June 21, 2022, Dillon signed with the New Orleans Saints. He was released on August 3, 2022.

References

External links
Marian Knights football bio
Minnesota Vikings bio

1997 births
Living people
American football tight ends
Marian Knights football players
Minnesota Vikings players
New York Jets players
New Orleans Saints players
Vegas Vipers players
People from Carroll County, Indiana
Players of American football from Indiana